The fifth season of the Syfy reality television series Face Off premiered on August 13, 2013. The season features 16 prosthetic makeup artists competing against each other to create makeup effects. This is the first season to feature the return of eight prior contestants competing against eight new contestants. The grand prize for the fifth season is a VIP trip from Kryolan to one of their 85 locations, a 2013 Fiat 500, and $100,000. This is the second season where a contestant voluntarily left the competition, with the first being Season 3.  Laura Tyler of Orlando, Florida, was the winner of the season.

Judges
 Ve Neill
 Glenn Hetrick
 Neville Page
 McKenzie Westmore (Host)
 Michael Westmore (mentor)

Contestants

Contestant progress

 The contestant was a Veteran.
 The contestant was a Newcomer.
 The contestant won Face Off.
  The contestant was a runner-up.
 The contestant won a Spotlight Challenge.
 The contestant was part of a team that won the Spotlight Challenge.
 The contestant was in the top in the Spotlight Challenge.
 The contestant was in the bottom in the Spotlight Challenge.
 The contestant was in the bottom in the Spotlight Challenge but was not eliminated due to a contestant dropping out of the competition.
 The contestant was a teammate of the eliminated contestant in the Spotlight Challenge.
 The contestant dropped out of the competition.
 The contestant was eliminated.
‡ The contestant won the Foundation Challenge.

Episodes

Special: The Vets Strike Back
A review of the eight veteran contestants' performances in their respective seasons by McKenzie and the judges along with a preview of the new season.

References

External links

 
 

2013 American television seasons
Face Off (TV series)